Jóia is a 1975 studio album by Caetano Veloso. The album was released simultaneously with Qualquer Coisa. The original cover art, picturing Veloso, his wife and his son naked, was censored by the ruling Brazilian military dictatorship and substituted by one with only doves on it.

Track listing

 "Minha mulher" (Caetano Veloso) – 4:46
 "Guá" (Perinho Albuquerque, Caetano Veloso) – 3:13
 "Pelos olhos" (Caetano Veloso) – 2:35
 "Asa, Asa" (Caetano Veloso) – 1:36
 "Lua, lua, lua, lua" (Caetano Veloso) – 3:59
 "Canto do povo de um lugar" (Caetano Veloso) – 4:11
 "Pipoca moderna" (Sebastião Biano, Caetano Veloso) – 3:11
 "Jóia" (Caetano Veloso) – 1:27
 "Help" (Lennon, McCartney) – 2:30
 "Gravidade" (Caetano Veloso) – 2:55
 "Tudo tudo tudo" (Caetano Veloso) – 2:00
 "Na asa do vento" (Luiz Vieira, João do Vale) – 4:08
 "Escapulário" (Oswald de Andrade, Caetano Veloso) – 2:17

References

1975 albums
Caetano Veloso albums
Música Popular Brasileira albums
PolyGram albums
Portuguese words affected by the 1990 spelling reform
Albums produced by Caetano Veloso